Golden Days for Boys and Girls was a late 19th-century children's story paper, distributed weekly as an accompaniment to the paper Saturday Night. Running from March 6, 1880, to May 11, 1907, Golden Days cost subscribers $3 a year. It was the brainchild of newspaperman James Elverson (1838–1911), who later owned the Philadelphia Inquirer.

The first printing of this paper had an output of three million copies, and by the second number, had 52,000 subscribers. According to a newspaper advertisement in 1885, the 16 page weekly had a circulation above 70,000 by this year. Another ad circa 1888 puts the number somewhere between 110,000 and 120,000 weekly sales, being distributed from coast to coast in the United States.

Golden Days featured stories, activities and lessons which were mostly gender-specific, with separate stories appealing to boys and girls.  Many of the stories were serialized over several issues; a measure designed to drive increased weekly sales. The themes largely involved school, athletics, westerns and the frontier, travel, exploration, adventure, the sea, and success stories.   The paper also included a weekly puzzle page, Puzzledom; a section for advice and responses to the young readers, the Letter Box; and a weekly Bible lesson and devotional titled "International Lessons", provided by such persons as Rev. D. P. Kidder, D. D. and Rev C. E. Strobridge, D. D. Certainly, this paper's contents catered to parents and clergymen, offering alternative material to the violence and debauchery of the 'blood and thunder' dime novels, such as those published by Frank Tousey and Norman Munro.

List of authors
This is not a fully comprehensive list of authors.

 Horatio Alger, Jr.
 L. E. Bailey
 William Perry Brown
 Wilton Burton
 Harry Castlemon
 William Pendleton Chipman
 Frank H. Converse
 George H. Coomer
 John Russell Coryell
 John W. Davidson
 Edward S. Ellis
 W. Bert Foster
 William Murray Graydon
 Edward Greey
 Charles H. Heustis
 Fred E. Janette
 Dr. Willard Mackenzie
 L.M. Montgomery
 Emma A. Opper
 Oliver Optic
 James Otis Kaler
 Celia Pearse
 St. George Rathborne
 Evelyn Raymond
 Victor St. Clair
 Edward Shippen, M.D.
 James H. Smith
 Frank R. Stockton
 Edward Stratemeyer
 Rose Hartwick Thorpe
 Mary T. Waggaman
 Matthew White, Jr.
 John H. Whitson
 Fannie Williams
 Ernest A. Yong

References

External links

 Golden Days: for Boys and Girls at the Digital Library@Villanova University 

Children's magazines published in the United States
Defunct magazines published in the United States
Magazines established in 1880
Magazines disestablished in 1907
Magazines published in Philadelphia
Newspaper supplements
Weekly magazines published in the United States